Ingalls is a town in Green Township, Madison County, Indiana, United States. It is part of the Anderson, Indiana Metropolitan Statistical Area. The population was 2,391 at the 2010 census.

History
Ingalls was platted in 1893. It was named in honor of Melville E. Ingalls, a railroad official.

Geography
Ingalls is located at  (39.957440, -85.802397).

Demographics

2010 census
As of the census of 2010, there were 2,394 people, 834 households, and 649 families living in the town. The racial makeup of the town was 92.4% White, 3.0% African American, 0.4% Native American, 0.3% Asian, 1.4% from other races, and 2.3% from two or more races. Hispanic or Latino of any race were 3.9% of the population.

There were 834 households, of which 51.6% had children under the age of 18 living with them; 53.8% were married couples living together; 15.3% had a female householder with no husband present; 8.6% had a male householder with no wife present; and 22.2% were non-families. 16.7% of all households were made up of individuals, and 4.8% had someone living alone who was 65 years of age or older. The average household size was 2.87 and the average family size was 3.15.

The median age in the town was 29.8 years. 32.9% of residents were under the age of 18; 7.1% were between the ages of 18 and 24; 36.3% were from 25 to 44; 16.3% were from 45 to 64; and 7.6% were 65 years of age or older. The gender makeup of the town was 49.5% male and 50.5% female.

2000 census
As of the census of 2000, there were 1,168 people, 422 households, and 335 families living in the town. The racial makeup of the town was 97.86% White, 0.34% African American, 0.09% Native American, 0.09% Asian, and 1.63% from two or more races. Hispanic or Latino of any race were 1.03% of the population.

There were 422 households, out of which 39.8% had children under the age of 18 living with them, 65.2% were married couples living together, 10.2% had a female householder with no husband present, and 20.6% were non-families. 17.3% of all households were made up of individuals, and 8.3% had someone living alone who was 65 years of age or older. The average household size was 2.77 and the average family size was 3.10.

In the town, the population was spread out, with 29.5% under the age of 18, 8.0% from 18 to 24, 32.0% from 25 to 44, 20.0% from 45 to 64, and 10.5% who were 65 years of age or older. The median age was 34 years. For every 100 females, there were 101.7 males. For every 100 females age 18 and over, there were 95.3 males.

The median income for a household in the town was $43,456, and the median income for a family was $50,577. Males had a median income of $35,526 versus $25,700 for females. The per capita income for the town was $16,988. About 3.7% of families and 5.4% of the population were below the poverty line, including 3.7% of those under age 18 and 6.7% of those age 65 or over.

References

External links
 Town of Ingalls, Indiana website

Towns in Madison County, Indiana
Towns in Indiana
Populated places established in 1893
1893 establishments in Indiana